Union Township is a township in Webster County, in the U.S. state of Missouri.

Union Township was erected on May 22, 1855, and was named because they united several communities and towns to form the township.

References

Townships in Missouri
Townships in Webster County, Missouri